Presbyterian Manse is a historic wooden building on Edisto Island, South Carolina. This -story building was built in 1790 and added to the National Register of Historic Places on May 14, 1971.  The building which land was donated by Henry Bowers was constructed for the minister of the church.

References

Presbyterian churches in South Carolina
Properties of religious function on the National Register of Historic Places in South Carolina
Religious buildings and structures completed in 1790
Buildings and structures in Charleston County, South Carolina
National Register of Historic Places in Charleston County, South Carolina
1790 establishments in South Carolina
18th-century Presbyterian church buildings in the United States